Thierry Omeyer (born 2 November 1976) is a retired French handball goalkeeper.

A member of the French national team since 1999, he has won all major titles with the team: world champion (five times), European champion (three times) and Olympic champion twice.

He is widely considered to be one of the best handball goalkeepers of all time, and is the third goalkeeper so far to have been elected best player of the world by the International Handball Federation (the two others being Henning Fritz, in 2004, and Árpád Sterbik, in 2005), what he achieved in 2008. In his former club (THW Kiel), his nickname was Die Mauer (The Wall).

Club career
Omeyer started handball at the age of 9 in Cernay (Alsace). In 1994, he joined his first professional club, Sélestat. His save percentage being up to 50%, he caught the attention of the best club in the French championship, Montpellier. Quickly becoming the first choice goalkeeper, he won five championships (from 2002 to 2006) and five national cups (2001, 2002, 2003, 2005 and 2006). The biggest highlight of his time there is the win of the 2003 EHF Champions League, a title that had never been won by a French club before.

In 2006, he decided to leave for a more competitive championship and joined the German club THW Kiel, with whom he won the double, the championship and the national cup in 2007 and 2008, plus the Champions League in 2007, 2010 and 2012.

On 15 April 2014, Paris Saint-Germain announced that both Thierry Omeyer and William Accambray were leaving Montpellier in order to join their club next season. 

Omeyer played his last professional match on 6 June 2019 against  Cesson-Rennes, PSG, who had already secured the title, defeated Cesson-Rennes 29-20, which ensured the latter's relegation.

International career
He made his debut for the French national team on September 19, 1999 against Romania. In 2001, he became World champion after beating Sweden 28-25 (after two extra-times) in the final.

In 2008, he became Olympic champion after an excellent tournament where he was voted best goalkeeper with a rate of 41% shots saved all over the competition. In the final, he saved 11 shots out of 39 to ensure France' 28-23 win over Iceland.

In 2015, he became World champion after beating Qatar 25-22. He was voted best goalkeeper and the MVP of the tournament.

Individual awards
Most Valuable Player (MVP) of the World Championship: 2015
All-Star Goalkeeper of the World Championship: 2011, 2015
All-Star Goalkeeper of the European Championship: 2006
IHF World Player of the Year: 2008

References

1976 births
Living people
Sportspeople from Mulhouse
French male handball players
Handball players at the 2004 Summer Olympics
Handball players at the 2008 Summer Olympics
Handball players at the 2012 Summer Olympics
Handball players at the 2016 Summer Olympics
Olympic handball players of France
Olympic gold medalists for France
Olympic silver medalists for France
French twins
Montpellier Handball players
Olympic medalists in handball
Medalists at the 2008 Summer Olympics
Medalists at the 2012 Summer Olympics
Medalists at the 2016 Summer Olympics
Officers of the Ordre national du Mérite
European champions for France
Expatriate handball players
French expatriate sportspeople in Germany
THW Kiel players
Handball-Bundesliga players
21st-century French people